Manitowaning Water Aerodrome  is located adjacent to Manitowaning, Ontario, Canada.

See also
 Manitowaning/Manitoulin East Municipal Airport

References

Registered aerodromes in Ontario
Seaplane bases in Ontario